Simonas Kairys (born 19 April 1984) is a Lithuanian politician, former Deputy Mayor of Kaunas City and Kaunas City Councillor.

On 7 December 2020, he was approved to be the as Minister of Culture in the Šimonytė Cabinet.

Biography
He was born and raised in Telšiai, where he graduated from high school in 2003. In 2007 graduated from Vytautas Magnus University with a Bachelor's degree in Political Sciences. In 2011, he obtained a Master's degree in Law at Mykolas Romeris University.

Political career
Since 2008 is a Member of Liberal Movement.

Between 2007 and 2011 he worked as an Assistant of the Deputy Mayor of Kaunas, project manager of the Institute of Liberal Thought.
 
From 2011 to 2019 he was elected a member of Kaunas City Councillor.

Since 2015 until 2019 Kairys worked as the Deputy Mayor of Kaunas.

From 2019 he is Advisor of the Mayor of Kaunas.

References

Sources
 Rezultatai - vrk.lt
 Simonas Kairys

1984 births
21st-century Lithuanian politicians
Liberal Movement (Lithuania) politicians
Living people
Ministers of Culture of Lithuania
Mykolas Romeris University alumni
Vytautas Magnus University alumni